β-Ureidoisobutyric acid is an intermediate in the catabolism of thymine.

References

Carboxamides
Ureas